NIO or Nio may refer to:
 Nio, guardians of the Buddha
 Nio Inc., a Chinese electric automobile manufacturer
 Nicaraguan córdoba, currency by ISO 4217 currency code
 National Institute of Oceanography (disambiguation), several organizations
 National Institute of Ophthalmology (disambiguation), several organizations
 Neurotechnology Industry Organization
 Non-blocking I/O (usually "NIO"), a collection of Java programming language APIs introduced with the J2SE 1.4 release of Java by Sun Microsystems
 Northern Ireland Office, an arm of the United Kingdom government, responsible for Northern Ireland affairs
 Nickel(II) oxide, NiO
 Liang (surname), pronounced and romanized as Nio in several southern Chinese variants

See also
 Ios (aka: Nios), an island in Greece
 Nios (disambiguation)